Marc Meiling (born 22 March 1962 in Stuttgart) is a German judoka.

He won a silver medal in the half-heavyweight (95 kg) division at the 1988 Summer Olympics.

External links
Profile at Sports-Reference.com

1962 births
Living people
German male judoka
Judoka at the 1984 Summer Olympics
Judoka at the 1988 Summer Olympics
Olympic judoka of West Germany
Olympic silver medalists for West Germany
Olympic medalists in judo
Medalists at the 1988 Summer Olympics
Sportspeople from Stuttgart
21st-century German people
20th-century German people